Minuca rapax, also known by its common name mudflat fiddler crab, is a species from the genus Minuca.

References

Ocypodoidea
Crustaceans described in 1870